Hamzeh-ye Sofla (also Romanized as Ḩamzeh-ye Soflá; also known as Khamzeh-ye Pā’īn) is a village in Jarahi Rural District, in the Central District of Mahshahr County, Khuzestan Province, Iran. At the 2006 census, its population was 160, in 31 families.

References 

Populated places in Mahshahr County